"I'm Not Ready Yet" is a song written by Tom T. Hall. It was originally released by The Blue Boys in 1968, whose version peaked at number 58 on the Billboard Hot Country Singles chart. The song was covered by American country music artist Tammy Wynette on her 1979 album, Just Tammy.  It was most successfully covered by American country music artist George Jones on his 1980 album I Am What I Am. It was released in August 1980 as album's second single following the monster smash "He Stopped Loving Her Today." Jones' version peaked at number 2 on the Billboard Hot Country Singles chart.  As Rich Kienzle observes in the liner notes to the 1994 Sony compilation The Essential George Jones: The Spirit of Country, the Hall composition "seemed to also reflect on George's mortality though Hall's lyrics weren't originally conceived that way."

Chart performance

The Blue Boys

George Jones

References 

1980 singles
Tammy Wynette songs
George Jones songs
Songs written by Tom T. Hall
Song recordings produced by Billy Sherrill
Epic Records singles
1968 songs